András Sütő (17 June 1927 – 30 September 2006) was an ethnic Hungarian journalist, writer, playwright and politician from Romania, one of the leading writers in the Hungarian language in the 20th century.

Early life and education

Sütő was born into a poor peasant family in Cămărașu, Cluj County, in the Transylvania region of Romania. He received his primary and secondary school education in the Reformed College of Aiud and in the Reformed gymnasium in Cluj. After secondary school, he studied stage directing at the Szentgyörgyi István College of Dramatic Arts in Cluj.

Career

Journalism
Sütő quit college to become the editor in chief of the Falvak Népe weekly. He moved to Bucharest in 1951 because the editorial office was relocated there. Sütő could not identify himself with the political environment of the 1950s in the capital and returned in 1954 to Târgu Mureș, in Transylvania, where he edited Igaz Szó, a literary magazine. He held this post till 1957, after which he edited Uj Élet, an illustrated magazine, until 1989.

Literature
Sütő's first work (A Letter to a Romanian Friend) was published by the Hungarian-language Világosság journal in Cluj, when he was 18. His writing career ranged across genres, with short stories (Félrejáró Salamon, 1955), satire (Pompás Gedeon, 1967), historical drama (Egy lócsiszár virágvasárnapja, 1974; Csillag a máglyán, 1974; Szuzai menyegzo, 1981), and myth and folklore (Káin és Abel, 1977; Advent a Hargitán, 1987). The dramas, in particular, probed the duty of the individual, confronted by arbitrary authority, to preserve his dignity and identity even at the cost of his life.

He served as vice-president of the Writers' Association of Romania between 1974 and 1982.

From 1980, aiming to curb his dissent against the Nicolae Ceaușescu regime's repression of Romania's Hungarian minorities, András Sütő's works were banned from publication and presentation. Consequently, between 1980 and 1989 he could publish only in Hungary. During this period, he and his family were constantly harassed by the authorities and the Securitate.

Politics
A committed Communist, Sütő was a member of the Great National Assembly, the parliament of Communist Romania, between 1965 and 1977. He was also an alternate member of the Executive Committee of the Central Committee of the Romanian Communist Party from 1969 to 1984. But his observations of the fate of the indigenous Romanian and Hungarian villagers in Transylvania under forced collectivisation in the 1950s and his discontent with the increasing centralisation of political power brought him into disfavour from the Ceaușescu government. Increasingly he also opposed the regime's pressure to "homogenise" the various nationalities in the country, such as restrictions against the use of the Hungarian language.

By the time of Ceaușescu's removal from power during the Romanian Revolution of 1989, Sütő was a well-known public figure, respected for his support of the rights of the Hungarian people in Romania.

Awards
In 1979, Sütő was awarded the Herder Prize.

He also received the Gábor Bethlen Prize (1990), and the Kossuth Prize (1992).

Later life
Sütő had his eye gouged out during the 1990 ethnic clashes of Târgu Mureș, and had to undergo treatment in Hungary. He died on 30 September 2006 in Budapest, where he was undergoing treatment for cancer.

Selected works

Drama
Mezítlábas menyasszony (Barefoot Bride), 1950     
Pompás Gedeon (Gedeon the Pompous), 1967    
Csillag a máglyán (Star at the Stake), 1974
Egy lócsiszár virágvasárnapja (The Palm Sunday of a Horse Dealer), 1975   
Káin és Abel (Cain and Abel), 1977
Advent a Hargitán (Advent in the Hargita Mountain), 1985
Alomkommandó (Dream Commando), 1987
Balkáni gerle (Collared Dove), 1999

Novels and short stories
Félrejáró Salamon (By-Stepping Salomon), 1956 
Anyám könnyű álmot ígér (Mother Promises a Light Dream), 1970

Essays and memoirs
Engedjétek hozzám jönni a szavakat (Let the Words Come to Me), 1977
Perzsák (Persians), 1981
Szemet szóért (Eye for a Word), 1993

External links 
 Sütő's digitalised works

References

1927 births
2006 deaths
People from Cluj County
Romanian people of Hungarian descent
Romanian dramatists and playwrights
Romanian essayists
Romanian newspaper editors
Romanian male novelists
Hungarian-language writers
Hungarian male dramatists and playwrights
Hungarian essayists
Male essayists
Hungarian journalists
Hungarian male novelists
20th-century Romanian novelists
20th-century Hungarian dramatists and playwrights
20th-century essayists
20th-century Romanian male writers
20th-century Hungarian male writers
20th-century Romanian dramatists and playwrights
20th-century Hungarian novelists
20th-century journalists
Members of the Great National Assembly
Herder Prize recipients
Deaths from skin cancer
Deaths from cancer in Hungary
Romanian Communist Party politicians